is a Japanese actress.

Selected filmography

Film
 Fruits of Passion (1981)
 Double Bed (1983, Nikkatsu)
 Farewell to the Ark (1984)
 It's a Summer Vacation Everyday (1994)
 Rebirth of Mothra (1996)
 Ultraman Cosmos: The First Contact (2001)
 Honey and Clover (2008)
 Aristocrats (2021)
 The End of the Pale Hour (2022)
Shikake-nin Fujieda Baian 2 (2023)

TV
 Fuzoroi no ringotachi (ふぞろいの林檎たち Odd Apples) (1983, 1985, 1991, 1997)
 Hanekonma (1986)

References

External links

JMDb profile (in Japanese)

Japanese actresses
1961 births
Living people